Shiopujan Shastri (born January 1908, date of death May 1983) was an Indian politician. He was elected to the Lok Sabha, the lower house of the Parliament of India from Bikramganj constituency in Bihar as a member of the Indian National Congress.

References

External links
 Official biographical sketch in Parliament of India website

Indian National Congress politicians
Lok Sabha members from Bihar
India MPs 1967–1970
India MPs 1971–1977
1908 births
Year of death missing
Samyukta Socialist Party politicians
Indian National Congress politicians from Bihar